Garbha Pindasana (IAST: Garbha Piṇḍāsana), Embryo in Womb Pose, sometimes shortened to Garbhasana, is a seated balancing asana in hatha yoga and modern yoga as exercise.

The pose is identical to Uttana Kurmasana, the inverted tortoise pose, except that the body is on the back in that pose instead of balancing upright.

Etymology and origins

The name comes from the Sanskrit words garbha meaning "womb"; piṇḍa, meaning  "embryo" or "foetus"; and āsana (आसन) meaning "posture" or "seat".

The pose is described in the 17th century Bahr al-Hayāt.

The limb positions of Garbha Pindasana are identical to those in Uttana Kurmasana, which is illustrated in the 19th century Sritattvanidhi.

Description 

The legs are crossed in Padmasana; practitioners who cannot easily keep the feet in Padmasana may cross the legs in Sukhasana. The arms are threaded through behind the knees, and the hands then reach up to grasp the ears. The body is then balanced on the coccyx (the tailbone).

In Ashtanga Vinyasa Yoga, the pose is in the primary series.

Variations 

The arm position may be varied. 

Another form is the reclining Supta Garbhasana with the ankles crossed behind the neck, the same as Yoganidrasana.

Claims

Twentieth century advocates of some schools of yoga, such as B. K. S. Iyengar, made claims for the effects of yoga on specific organs, without adducing any evidence. 
Iyengar claimed that this pose makes the blood circulate well around the abdominal organs, which are "contracted completely", keeping them "in trim".

See also 

 List of asanas

References

Sources

Sitting asanas
Medieval Hatha Yoga asanas
Asymmetric asanas